Jaroslavia ianthinipennis is a species of beetles in the family Buprestidae, the only species in the genus Jaroslavia.

References

Monotypic Buprestidae genera